Titus Peducaeus (fl. 1st century BC) was a Roman senator who was appointed suffect consul in 35 BC.

Biography
Peducaeus was a member of a late Republican senatorial family, but much of Peducaeus’ career is unclear. Confusion in the sources means that events in which a Peducaeus participated could be assigned to a number of individuals of the same gens. It is believed that Titus Peducaeus may possibly have been the Caesarean governor of Corsica et Sardinia in 48 BC; the primary source for this, Appian, gives him the praenomen "Sextus", but this has been questioned.

By 40 BC, he was possibly a legate under Lucius Antonius in Hispania. Then in 35 BC, he was appointed consul suffectus, replacing Lucius Cornificius. Nothing further is known of his career.

Sources
 Broughton, T. Robert S., The Magistrates of the Roman Republic, Vol II (1952)
 Shackleton-Bailey, D. R., Cicero: Letters to Atticus: Volume 4, Books 7.10-10 (2004)

References

1st-century BC Roman consuls
Senators of the Roman Republic
Roman governors of Sardinia
Peducaei
Year of birth unknown
Year of death unknown